European Radiology is a monthly peer-reviewed medical journal published by Springer Science+Business Media. It was established in 1991 by J. Lissner and is the official journal of the European Society of Radiology. The current editor-in-chief is Yves Menu. The following European societies of sub-disciplines have chosen European Radiology as their official organ:
 European Society of Breast Imaging (EUSOBI)
 European Society of Cardiac Radiology (ESCR)
 European Society of Gastrointestinal and Abdominal Radiology (ESGAR)
 European Society of Emergency Radiology (ESER)
 European Society of Head and Neck Radiology (ESHNR)
 European Society of Molecular and Functional Imaging in Radiology (ESMOFIR)
 European Society of Oncologic Imaging (ESOI)
 European Society of Thoracic Imaging (ESTI)
 European Society of Urogenital Radiology (ESUR)
 The EuroPACS Association

According to the Journal Citation Reports, the journal has a 2014 impact factor of 4.014.

References

External links
 
 

Publications established in 1991
Radiology and medical imaging journals
English-language journals
Monthly journals
Springer Science+Business Media academic journals